Jean-Pierre or Jean Pierre may refer to:

People

 Karine Jean-Pierre b.1977, White House Deputy Press Secretary for President Joe Biden 2021-
 Jean-Pierre, Count of Montalivet (1766–1823), French statesman and Peer of France
 Eugenia Pierre (better known as Jean Pierre, 1944–2002), Trinidadian netballer and parliamentarian

Places
 Jean-Pierre Bay, on the Gouin Reservoir in Quebec, Canada

Arts and entertainment
"Jean Pierre", song by Miles Davis from Miles! Miles! Miles!
 Jean-Pierre, chef on television series Metalocalypse
 Jean-Pierre Delmas, in French animated television series Code Lyoko
 Jean Pierre, a character in Fighter's History
Jean Pierre Polnareff, a character from JoJo's Bizarre Adventure